The Usturoi is a right tributary of the river Săsar in Romania. It flows into the Săsar in the city Baia Mare.

References

Rivers of Romania
Rivers of Maramureș County